Richard Black (Harry Richard Black, 1921–2014) was an American artist.

Richard Black or Dick Black may also refer to:

 Dick Black (politician) (Richard Hayden Black, born 1944), American politician
 Dicky Black, jockey in the 1950 Grand National
 Richard Horatio Black (1839–1911), American politician and official
 Dick Black (footballer) (Arthur Richard Black, 1907–?), Scottish footballer

See also
Rick Black (born 1943), Canadian football player
Rich Blak, musician